Barry Lauwers (born 29 November 1999) is a Dutch professional footballer who plays as a goalkeeper for FC Volendam.

References

1999 births
Living people
Dutch footballers
FC Volendam players
Tweede Divisie players
Eerste Divisie players
Association football goalkeepers